James Adams (born 1896) was an English footballer who played in the Football League for Chesterfield.

References

English footballers
Chesterfield F.C. players
English Football League players
1896 births
1973 deaths
Matlock Town F.C. players
Association football forwards